Federico Nanni (born 22 September 1981) is a Sammarinese former footballer who played as an attacking midfielder. He made seven appearances for the San Marino national team.

References

External links
 
 

Living people
1981 births
Sammarinese footballers
Association football midfielders
San Marino international footballers
A.C. Libertas players